Christian Chamber of Commerce and Industry is an organisation of Christian businesspeople in India. It was set up in 2010 to act as platform for Christian businesspeople so that they may benefit from networking and achieving a higher rate of growth. Its headquarters is in Hyderabad India.

References

Christian organisations based in India
Organisations based in Hyderabad, India
Business organisations based in India
2010 establishments in Andhra Pradesh
Organizations established in 2010